Ariadna Gil i Giner (born 23 January 1969) is a Spanish actress. She is known for her performances in films such as Belle Époque (for which she won the Goya Award for Best Actress), Black Tears and Pan's Labyrinth.

Career
Film director Bigas Luna discovered her for the 1986 movie  Lola. After four films primarily in Catalan, though partly in Spanish and French, she took part in a movie exclusively in Spanish shot in 1991, Emilio Martínez Lázaro's Amo tu cama rica, and has gone on to play in myriad films and series in Catalan, Spanish, French and English, among other languages.

Between 1993 and 2007, she performed in more than thirty films, including Libertarias, directed by  Vicente Aranda; Pan's Labyrinth, directed by Guillermo del Toro; and Soldados de Salamina, directed by her former husband David Trueba.

Personal life
Gil was married to screenwriter, director, and novelist David Trueba with whom she has two children, Violeta (b. 1997) and Leo (b. 2003).

Gil has been in a relationship with American actor Viggo Mortensen since 2009.

Filmography

Film

Television

Awards 

1992: Premio Ondas a la mejor actriz, "Amo tu cama rica"
1992: Premio del Festival de Peñíscola a la mejor actriz, "Amo tu cama rica"
1993: Premio Goya a la mejor actriz, "Belle Époque"
1993: Fotogramas de plata, "Belle Époque"

References

External links

 LaPelikula

1969 births
Living people
Actresses from Barcelona
Spanish film actresses
Film actresses from Catalonia
Best Actress Goya Award winners
Spanish television actresses
20th-century Spanish actresses
21st-century Spanish actresses